Roger Caumo (born April 20, 1979) is a Brazilian sprint canoer who competed in the early 2000s. He was eliminated in the heats of both the K-1 500 m and the K-1 1000 m events at the 2000 Summer Olympics in Sydney.

References
Sports-Reference.com profile

1979 births
Brazilian male canoeists
Canoeists at the 2000 Summer Olympics
Living people
Olympic canoeists of Brazil
Pan American Games medalists in canoeing
Pan American Games bronze medalists for Brazil
Canoeists at the 1999 Pan American Games
Canoeists at the 2003 Pan American Games
Medalists at the 1999 Pan American Games
Medalists at the 2003 Pan American Games
21st-century Brazilian people